G2.com, formerly G2 Crowd, is a peer-to-peer review site headquartered in Chicago, Illinois. It was known as G2 Labs, Inc. until 2013. The company was launched in May 2012 by former BigMachines employees, with a focus on aggregating user reviews for business software.

Service 

Platform users can sign in with a LinkedIn account and can review the products they use. To encourage reviewers to participate, some users are compensated by G2.com with gift cards, contest rewards and reputation points on the website. G2 attempts to identify fraudulent user reviews through an algorithm that identifies employees at companies reviewing their own products and employees at companies reviewing their competitor's product. In addition, reviews are manually screened and voted on by the community to discourage spam and unhelpful comments. G2 also requests screenshots of the reviewer using the product for verification purposes.

Information from reviews is aggregated to score business software products on The GridSM, which acts as a competitor to Gartner's magic quadrant review model. Satisfaction and market presence ratings are generated based on product reviews and market presence data, which are then used to plot products onto a quadrant. The four quadrants in a G2 Crowd Grid are Leaders, High Performers, Contenders and Niche.

Research reviews 

The reviews submitted to G2 are available for public consumption. An individual researching software can build their profile and filter information provided by reviewers similar to themselves based on company size, user role and user industry.

History 

In 2012 five former employees of BigMachines – Tim Handorf, Godard Abel, Matt Gorniak, Mark Myers and Mike Wheeler – founded G2, with Abel serving as president. When Abel left to continue building Steelbrick (now Salesforce CPQ) with Salesforce, Handorf took over as CEO, a role he continues in today.

A beta version of the review site launched in December 2012, with several thousand users testing the service before its full launch in 2013.

In early 2018, G2 Cofounders Godard Abel and Matt Gorniak returned to the company after a brief period building Salesforce acquired Steelbrick CPQ.

In May 2019, G2 acquired Advocately, a B2B customer advocacy platform, with the aim of amplifying customer voices and accelerating review collection.

Funding 

In 2014, G2 raised $2.3 million in seed funding from investors, including Chicago Ventures, Hyde Park Venture Partners, Andrew Filipowski, and Greg Jones, founding CEO of uBid. In 2015, G2 raised an additional $7 million in Series A funding led by Pritzker Group Venture Capital. Investors included 2014's contributors in addition to co-founder Godard Abel, Thomas Lehrman, and Scott Dorsey. G2 Crowd announced it would use these funds to invest in its leadership and capabilities.

In 2017, G2 secured a $30 million Series B, led by VC Accel with participation from LinkedIn and the company's founders. The funds are being used to help the company expand into services.

In 2021, G2 reached a $1.1 billion valuation with a $157 million Series D funding. The Series D funding brought G2's total funding to $257 million and put G2 on the list of Unicorn startups that are valued at over $1 billion.

Significant milestones 

In December 2015, G2 surpassed 50,000 verified-user product reviews, more than 28,000 of which were submitted that year. The firm also reported that more than 3,000 reviews were submitted per month on average. In January 2016, G2 reported more than 400,000 sessions per month, and includes more than 400 product categories.

In September 2016, G2 reached more than 100,000 reviews.

Awards 

G2 has been nominated for and earned a number of awards since its founding for its growth and culture.

2013 
 Top 100 nominee Chicago Innovation Award

2015 
 Adrienne Weissman, G2 Crowd (Crain's Chicago Business)
 Top 100 Small Business Influencer Award (Small Business Trends)
50 on Fire Award nominee (Chicago Inno)
 Coolest Companies nominee (Chicago Inno)

2016 

 G2 Crowd hires ex-IDC analyst Mike Fauscette as head of research

2018 
 50 on Fire Award nominee (Chicago Inno)
 No. 179 Fastest Growing Company (Inc. 500)

References

External links 

Software companies based in Illinois
Companies based in Chicago
American review websites
2012 establishments in Illinois
Software companies established in 2012